Émile Hugues (b. Vence, 7 April 1901 – d. Paris, 10 February 1966) was a French politician and government minister.

With a doctorate in law and by profession a notaire, Hugues was elected in 1946 as a Radical-Socialist député for the Alpes-Maritimes département to the second constituent National Assembly, and subsequently to the Assemblée nationale, in which he sat until 1958. In 1959, he was elected to the  Senate as a member of the Gauche démocratique (Democratic Left). He died in office.

Hugues left the government following the rejection of the planned European Defence Community in 1954, which he had warmly supported. He followed Henri Queuille and André Morice into the Radical dissidence in 1956, which led to the creation of the Centre républicain. He voted for Charles de Gaulle in June 1958, but was beaten in the November 1958 elections.

He was mayor of Vence and councillor for the Alpes-Maritimes.

The castle in Vences is today the Fondation Émile Hugues, a modern and contemporary art museum.

Government offices
 Secretary of State for Finance and Economic Affairs in the second government of René Pleven (11 August 1951 – 20 January 1952)
 Secretary of State for Information in the government of René Mayer (8 January – 28 June 1953)
 Secretary of State for Information in the governments of Joseph Laniel (2 July 1953 – 18 June 1954)
 Minister of Justice in the government of Pierre Mendès France (19 June – 3 September 1954)
 Secretary of State for Finance and Economic Affairs in the government of Maurice Bourgès-Maunoury (17 June – 6 November 1957)
 Secretary of State for Finance and Economic Affairs in the government of Félix Gaillard (11 November 1957 – 14 May 1958)

References

1901 births
1966 deaths
People from Alpes-Maritimes
Politicians from Provence-Alpes-Côte d'Azur
Radical Party (France) politicians
French Ministers of Justice
Members of the Constituent Assembly of France (1946)
Deputies of the 1st National Assembly of the French Fourth Republic
Deputies of the 2nd National Assembly of the French Fourth Republic
Deputies of the 3rd National Assembly of the French Fourth Republic
French Senators of the Fifth Republic
Senators of Alpes-Maritimes
Mayors of places in Provence-Alpes-Côte d'Azur
French people of the Algerian War